Always Audacious is a 1920 American silent romance film directed by James Cruze and written by Thomas J. Geraghty. The film stars Wallace Reid in a dual role, Margaret Loomis, Clarence Geldart, J.M. Dumont, Rhea Haines, Carmen Phillips, and Guy Oliver. It is based on the short story "Toujours de l'Audace" by Ben Ames Williams. The film was released on November 14, 1920, by Paramount Pictures. It is not known whether the film currently survives, which suggests that it is a lost film.

Cast
Wallace Reid as Perry Dayton / 'Slim' Attucks
Margaret Loomis as Camilla Joyt
Clarence Geldart as Theron Ammidown
J.M. Dumont as Jerry the Gent
Rhea Haines as Denver Kate
Carmen Phillips as Molly the Eel
Guy Oliver as Martin Green
Fanny Midgley as Mrs. Rumson

unbilled
Monte Blue - ?___unconfirmed

See also
Wallace Reid filmography

References

External links 

 
 Still at silentera.com
 Norwegian advertisement for the film
lobby poster

1920 films
1920s English-language films
American romance films
1920s romance films
Paramount Pictures films
Films directed by James Cruze
American black-and-white films
American silent feature films
1920s American films
Silent romantic drama films
Silent crime films